Shenzhen World station is an interchange station for Line 12 and Line 20 of Shenzhen Metro in Shenzhen, Guangdong, China. Line 20 platforms opened on 28 December 2021 and Line 12 platforms opened on 28 November 2022. It is located in Bao'an District, adjacent to Shenzhen World Exhibition & Convention Center.

Station layout

References

Railway stations in Guangdong
Shenzhen Metro stations
Bao'an District
Railway stations in China opened in 2021